Negeta contrariata is a moth in the family Nolidae first described by Francis Walker in 1862. It is found from the Indo-Australian tropics of India, Sri Lanka, Borneo east to Australia (Queensland) and the Bismarck Archipelago.

Description
Its wingspan is about 26 mm. Female ochreous brown. Forewings with traces of sinuous antemedial line. A creamy-white triangular patch can be seen on costa before apex. An oblique rufous and ochreous line runs from apex to center of inner margin. There is an indistinct lunulate fuscous sub-marginal line. Hindwings fuscous and cilia ochreous. Ventral surface with narrow curved medial fuscous band and traces of submarginal band.

References

Moths described in 1862
Chloephorinae